Tales from Riverdale was a comic digest magazine by Archie Comics Publications, first printed in 2005. The format changed from the old books, with Tales from Riverdale having one multi-part feature story, and the rest reprints or new stories.

Issues
The first issue was in the form of a school scrapbook, depicting the events of the previous year at Archie's school, Riverdale High.

Issue #3 introduced the manga version of Josie and the Pussycats.

Sabrina the Teenage Witch stories were also present in this digest, but in the format of the animated series and Sabrina: Friends Forever. In this version Sabrina was made 12 again by Repulsa, Queen of the Goblins, and the stories follow her adventures as a pre-teen.  The Spooky Jar and Uncle Quigly were also present. Hilda Spellman and Zelda Spellman were much younger too, most likely in their mid-to-late teens. These also ended up appearing occasionally in Betty and Veronica Digests. However these stories and styles were also shown in 1999-2002

Wendy Weatherbee's first appearance was Tales From Riverdale Digest #10 (2006).

Issue #22 featured a story titled "Civil Chores." In this story Archie, Jughead and other friends go head to head on the issue of allowance: one side wanting their allowances raised, the other side saying no, but possibly with an ulterior motive. Originally meant to be a two-part story, it ended up as a three-part story.

Conclusion
The title ended in August 2010 with issue #39, along with all four regular-sized digest titles, to make room for two new double digest titles.

References

Comics magazines published in the United States
2005 comics debuts
Magazines established in 2005
Archie Comics titles
Comic book digests
Magazines disestablished in 2010
Teen comedy comics
Romantic comedy comics
Defunct American comics